Chloroclystis roetschkei is a moth in the family Geometridae first described by Timm Karisch and Henri Hoppe in 2011. It is found in Equatorial Guinea on Bioko, an island off the Atlantic coast.

References

Moths described in 2011
roetschkei